The following is a list of county-maintained roads in Scott County, Minnesota, United States. Many routes in this list are also county-state-aid-highways (CSAH.)

Route list

References 

 
Scott